Marpissa grata is a species of jumping spider in the family Salticidae. It is found in the United States and Canada. As of 2012, it is known from Ontario in Canada, and from Florida, Iowa, Michigan, and Minnesota in the United States.

References

External links
 

Salticidae
Articles created by Qbugbot
Spiders described in 1936